The 1999 European Beach Volleyball Championships were held from August 24 to August 27, 1999, in Palma de Mallorca, Spain. It was the seventh official edition of the men's event, which started in 1993, while the women competed for the sixth time.

Men's competition
 A total number of 32 participating couples

Women's competition
 A total number of 32 participating couples

References
 Beach Volleyball Results

1999
E
B
1999